White Shield Public School District 85 is a school district headquartered in Roseglen, North Dakota.

It is entirely within McLean County and serves White Shield. It is affiliated with the Bureau of Indian Education (BIE). 

It previous building is from 1952, and by 2021 it was gaining a new building. The current two story,  facility was scheduled to open in 2016.

To deal with teacher shortages, White Shield hired Filipino/a national teachers with J-1 visas. By February 2020 the school had no more vacancies of teachers.

References

Further reading
 https://www.ndunited.org/wp-content/uploads/2018/02/White-Shield-2017-2018.pdf

External links
 White Shield School District

School districts in North Dakota
Education in McLean County, North Dakota